Peter Loy Chong (born 30 January 1961 in Namata, Fiji, Tailevu) is the third Catholic Archbishop of Suva, Fiji (having been consecrated bishop on 8 June 2013). He worked on his doctorate at the Graduate Theological Union in Berkeley, California, United States.

References

1961 births
Living people
Fijian Roman Catholics
Fijian Roman Catholic archbishops
20th-century Roman Catholic bishops in Oceania
21st-century Roman Catholic archbishops in Oceania
Pontifical Urban University alumni
Fijian people of Chinese descent
Roman Catholic archbishops of Suva